The Internal Revenue Code of Puerto Rico (Spanish: Código de Rentas Internas de Puerto Rico) is the main body of domestic statutory tax law of Puerto Rico organized topically, including laws covering income taxes, payroll taxes, gift taxes, estate taxes, and statutory excise taxes.

Sales and use tax

On July 4, 2006, the government approved Law 117, the 2006 Contributive Justice Law. It established a 5.5% state tax and an optional 1.5% municipal tax. It came into effect on November 15, 2006. The tax is better known as the Impuesto sobre Ventas y Uso (Sales and Use Tax) or by its Spanish acronym, IVU.

The law amended Article B of the Code and created sub-article BB.

On July 29, 2007, the government approved Law Number 80, making the tax mandatory for all municipalities of the commonwealth. Also, the tax rates changed to 6% at the state level and 1% at the municipal level.

In 2015, the Sales Tax and Use rate went from 7% to 11.5%.

See also

Legal profession in Puerto Rico
Law of Puerto Rico
Taxation in Puerto Rico

References

External links
Official web page of the Treasury Department (in Spanish)
 “Código de Rentas Internas para un Nuevo Puerto Rico”, o “Código de Rentas Internas de Puerto Rico de 2011” Ley Núm. 1 de 31 de Enero de 2011, según enmendada (1009 page .pdf)

Puerto Rican law
Economy of Puerto Rico
Taxation in Puerto Rico